Cosmosoma evadnes is a moth of the family Erebidae. It was described by Caspar Stoll in 1781. It is found in Suriname.

References

evadnes
Moths described in 1781